Three ships of the Royal Navy have been named HMS Atherstone after the town of Atherstone in Warwickshire, or after its hunt:

 , launched in 1916, was a  that served in World War I.
 , launched in 1939, was a  that served in World War II.

Royal Navy ship names